Přerov nad Labem is a municipality and village in Nymburk District in the Central Bohemian Region of the Czech Republic. It has about 1,200 inhabitants.

Geography
It lies in the Central Elbe Table lowland within the Polabí region. The municipality is situated on the left bank of the Elbe River, which forms the northern municipal border.

History
The first written mention of Přerov nad Labem is from 993. In 1499, the village was promoted to a market town by Vladislaus II, but it later lost the title.

Sights

The Church of Saint Adalbert was built in the early Baroque style in 1618–1682 and was rebuilt in 1865.

The Přerov nad Labem Castle was built at the end of the 14th century as administrative seat of the Břevnov Monastery. It the 1560s it was rebuilt in the Renaissance castle. Today the building is without use and inaccessible to the public.

Přerov nad Labem is a home of one of the oldest open-air museums in Europe. It was founded by Austrian aristocrat Ludwig Salvator in 1895.

Moto & Velo Museum is a private museum with an exposition of historic bicycles and motorcycles. It was opened in 1998.

References

External links

Open-air ethnographic museum official website

Villages in Nymburk District